European eXPErimental Re-entry Test-bed (EXPERT) is a European Space Agency aerothermodynamics research programme. It was planned that vehicle will be launched on a Russian Volna launch vehicle and will provide knowledge and experience in the design and development of re-entry vehicles. As of 2012, one element in a European Space Agency push to develop vehicles capable of re-entry has been pushed back until at least 2013 as the agency seeks a launch alternative to the Russian submarine-launched Volna rocket which was withdrawn. One of its main goals was to test materials for ESA's Intermediate eXperimental Vehicle (IXV), an unmanned, delta-winged plane launched in 2015 aboard ESA's new Vega small-satellite launcher. Currently EXPERT remains in storage conditions in Turin.

EXPERT Mission objectives 
According to an ESA-ESTEC paper, the EXPERT program has the following goals:

 Enable in-flight data gathering of selected aerothermodynamic phenomena with high accuracy and reliability
 Allow the validation of numerical modeling tools (CFD) and of methodologies for ground-to-flight data extrapolation
 Qualify in-flight classical and advanced measurement techniques
 Conduct extensive post-flight analyses based on in-flight data, pre-flight numerical databases, preflight ground testing activities.

References

External links
 European eXPErimental Re-entry Test-bed (EXPERT)
 EXPERT – European experimental re-entry test-bed
 EXPERT: An atmospheric re-entry test-bed
 Development of the re-entry spectrometer RESPECT for the ESA capsule EXPERT

European Space Agency satellites
Cancelled spacecraft